A K-1 visa is a visa issued to the fiancé or fiancée of a United States citizen to enter the United States. A K-1 visa requires a foreigner to marry his or her U.S. citizen petitioner within 90 days of entry, or depart the United States. Once the couple marries, the foreign citizen can adjust status to become a lawful permanent resident of the United States (Green Card holder). Although a K-1 visa is legally classified as a non-immigrant visa, it usually leads to important immigration benefits and is therefore often processed by the Immigrant Visa section of United States embassies and consulates worldwide.

In 2014, the Department of State issued a total of 35,925 K-1 visas to fiancées of U.S. citizens. Including derivative categories—mostly for children of fiancées—a total of 41,488 visas in the K category were issued.

In 2018, the total cost for all parts of the K-1 Visa was US$2,025.

Background 
The K visa category was established in 1970, during U.S. involvement in the Vietnam War. The U.S. military required that Vietnamese citizens who wished to marry a U.S. soldier obtain both an exit visa from the Vietnamese authorities and an immigrant visa from the U.S. Embassy.  Obtaining these documents was a time-consuming process and involved acquiring medical and police clearances for the Vietnamese citizen, and notarized Embassy certificates from the American.  Many couples could not complete the process before the soldier had to depart for the U.S.  When this happened, the Vietnamese citizen would be ineligible to receive a visitor visa to America as an intending immigrant.  Immigrant visa numbers were also unavailable.  In 1970, about 100 American-Vietnamese couples found themselves in this situation, resulting in considerable Congressional correspondence with the Embassy.  On April 7, 1970, Congress passed Public Law 91-225, which amended the Immigration and Nationality Act of 1952 and created the K visa category.

Today, U.S. law allows several ways for an American citizen to petition for a foreign loved one to immigrate to the United States.  Immigrant visas are available for an American to marry his or her spouse in a foreign country and then petition the spouse to immigrate to the United States.  Spouses of U.S. citizens receive immediate preference to immigrate to the United States.  However, in some cases a foreign citizen and an American citizen cannot legally marry in a foreign country, even though the marriage would have no legal impediments in the United States. For example, some countries require a parent's permission to marry even for adults, or forbid marrying someone of the same sex or outside of one's religion or ethnic group.  Additionally, some couples prefer to have their wedding in the United States.  It is in these circumstances such that a K-1 visa is especially useful.

Process of applying for a K-1 visa
Before filing for a K-1 Visa a couple must have seen each other in person within 2 years prior to the filing. It is important to collect evidence of having met in person prior to filing and include this evidence with the petition. Failure to provide evidence of having met in person can result in a RFE (Request for Evidence) later in the process.

An American ("petitioner") begins the K-1 visa application process on behalf a foreign fiancé(e) ("beneficiary") by filing form I-129F (Petition for Alien Fiancé(e)) with United States Citizenship and Immigration Services (USCIS), along with form I-134 (Affidavit of Support). Official instructions are available from the USCIS web site, or the US Department of State web site. No attorney or other intermediary is necessary to petition someone for a K-1 visa, however some choose to hire an attorney or document preparation agency to help with the paperwork and/or facilitate the process.

After the petition has been received by USCIS and proper fees collected, it is typically scanned and the proper background checks are initiated. Once a visa petition has been received by USCIS a notice with a receipt number is provided to the filer. This notice is typically called a NOA1, so called because it is usually the first Notice Of Action (NOA) that the petitioner receives.

Once a visa petition has been approved or denied by the USCIS service center, a notice typically referred to as a NOA2 is sent to the petitioner notifying them of the approval or denial of the petition. Approval of the petition does not ensure that the visa will be granted. If the petition is approved it is then sent to the National Visa Center of the State Department, which in turn forwards it to the Embassy or Consulate nearest the foreign fiancé(e). The Embassy or Consulate will notify the foreign fiancé(e) that a petition has been received, and provide information about how to schedule a medical exam with the panel physician, how to schedule an appointment for a visa interview at the Embassy, and the required documentation to bring with the foreign fiancé(e) to the interview. Prior to the interview, the foreign fiancé(e) will have to apply for the K-1 visa.

The I-129F petition is valid for four months from the date of approval by USCIS. The foreign fiancé(e) thus has four months to apply for a K-1 visa by completing Form DS-160, Nonimmigrant Visa Application, online. A consular officer may potentially extend the validity of the petition if it expires before visa processing is completed.

At the visa interview a Consular officer reviews the documents that both the American petitioner and the foreign fiancé(e) have submitted. The Consular officer looks for evidence of a relationship, and asks the foreign fiancé(e) questions to determine that a bona fide relationship exists. Typically, Embassies request that fiancé(e)s bring evidence of their relationship to the interview, such as photographs together, correspondence between the two, evidence of remittances to the fiancé(e), phone bills showing calls to each other, etc. Additionally income evidence is reviewed to insure that the petitioner meets the minimum income requirements. The current requirement is that the income of the petitioner meet or exceed 100% of the US poverty guidelines. In some cases a co-sponsor can be used to meet this requirement.

Some countries have specific additional requirements. The Philippines for example does not have legal divorce and so a CENOMAR (Certificate of No Marriage) must be provided to show eligibility of marriage.

Once the interview is finished the Consular officer can issue the visa, if the officer is convinced of a bona fide relationship that meets all legal requirements. The officer may also request that further evidence be submitted before making a decision. If the Consular officer does not think the relationship is bona fide or finds some legal impediment to issuing the visa, the petition will be returned to USCIS and recommended for revocation and no visa will be issued.

A K-1 visa is printed on a self-adhesive label, similar to a tourist visa, but annotated with the name of the petitioner. The label is placed into the fiancé(e)'s passport. It is valid for one entry into the United States within six months of the date of issuance.

The total time from filing of the initial petition to the actual issuance of a visa can vary, but recently has averaged around 15 months. The length of time depends partly on the processing speed of the USCIS center that receives the visa petition, as well as availability of appointments at the Embassy or Consulate nearest to the foreign fiancé(e). Visa petitioners and their fiancé(e) can avoid unnecessary delays by making sure their applications are completely and accurately filled out, and by scheduling necessary appointments with the panel physician and the US Embassy as soon as they are eligible to do so.

Requirements for a K-1 visa
Both fiancées must be eligible to be lawfully married in the state of residence of the petitioner. For example, at the time the visa petition is filed, as well as at issuance, they must both be of legal marriageable age, and not already married to each other or to anyone else.  Some individuals, such as those with certain untreated communicable diseases, those who have committed crimes of moral turpitude, those who are addicted to illegal drugs, persons who were previously deported from the US, and those who have engaged in acts of terrorism or are members of a designated terrorist organization, are ineligible for any immigrant visa.

Both fiancées must have met in person at least once within two years prior to filing the visa petition. This requirement may be waived by the Department of Homeland Security, but only for cases with strong cultural or religious traditions which preclude such a meeting.

Visa applicants are required to demonstrate to the Consular officer that they are unlikely to become public charges in the United States. Generally, this is accomplished by the petitioner filing an Affidavit of Support (Form I-134) showing he or she has an income or assets that are above that of the poverty line in the petitioner's state of residence. Both fiancées may be required to submit certain documents, such as birth certificates and ID cards, to prove their identity, as well as divorce decrees or annulment records to prove they are eligible to marry. The precise documents required are set by the Embassy in each country to reflect the documents commonly used in that country.

Related visa categories
The unmarried children, under 21 years old, of a K-1 visa beneficiary can also immigrate with their parent. Because such children derive their immigration status through a parent, they are known as derivative applicants, and are issued a K-2 visa. (The precise definition of a "child" for immigration purposes is complex, taking into account the various permutations of adoptive, stepparent, and half-sibling relationships that are possible.) Derivative children may either immigrate at the same time as their parent, or may follow to join the parent up to one year after the issuance of the parent's K-1 visa.

Two additional "K" categories of visas exist. The K-3 visa is for the spouse of a US citizen. It was created to allow a foreign spouse of a US citizen the opportunity to enter the US as a non-immigrant and adjust status to a lawful permanent resident by filling out the I-485 form to the USCIS. It is similar to the IR1/CR1 category which are also for the spouse of a US citizen. The only practical difference is that a K-3 visa is a non-immigrant visa, thus the foreign spouse must adjust to immigrant status after arrival in the US. The IR1/CR1 visa categories are immigrant visas thus require no adjustment of status once the beneficiary has arrived in the United States. A K-4 visa is a derivative visa issued to the child of a K-3 visa holder.

Fraud considerations
Because the K-1 visa leads to immediate immigration, and eligibility for employment, in the United States, it is considered to be a high fraud visa category.   To partially address these concerns, Congress passed the Immigration Marriage Fraud Amendments of 1986, which placed a two-year conditional period on a foreign spouse's permanent residency. Dissolution of the marriage within those two years can lead to removal of the foreigner's permanent residency status.

Professor Lenni B. Benson of the New York Law School has stated that  although the K-1 visa program is widely associated with sham marriages, "It is not true in the majority of cases."  

Detecting marriage fraud is of utmost importance to the USCIS. Government officials are specially trained to detect any fraud. Attributes of a "normal relationship," which proves validity, can be common language or religion, shared vacations, events, and holidays, combined finances and property and more, but most of all, it is the intention to have a real marital relationship.

A survey completed by the United States Immigration and Naturalization Service (INS) in the 1980s found approximately 30% of these marriages are under suspicion of fraud. Fraudulent marriage is any marriage that has been entered into with the sole purpose of circumventing the law. According to the Immigration and Nationality Act (INA), Act 255 [8 U.S.C 1325], the consequences of entering into a marriage in order to evade the law include incarceration for up to five years, a fine of up to $250,000, or both.

Other fraud concerns include routine romance scam or romance fraud, usually victimizing the American petitioner, as well as attempts by foreigners to pay an American to knowingly enter into a sham marriage.

International Marriage Broker Regulation Act

In response to concerns about domestic violence, Congress passed the International Marriage Broker Regulation Act in 2005.  The act requires that persons granted a K visa be given a brochure detailing the rights and protections for foreign spouses in the United States, and requires that American petitioners who have been convicted of certain crimes of violence, abuse or multiple crimes involving drugs declare this on the petition, among other things.  If two or more K-1 visa petitions were filed at any time in the past or if a petitioner previously had a K-1 visa petition approved within two years prior to the filing of another petition, the petitioner must apply for a waiver. To request a waiver a written request must be submitted with the new petition accompanied by documentation of the claim to the waiver. If the petitioner has a history of violent offenses, the adjudicator may not waive the filing limitations unless extraordinary circumstances exist in the petitioner's case.

Additionally, under the Adam Walsh Child Protection and Safety Act of 2006, any person convicted of a felony sex crime involving children is ineligible to petition a foreigner to immigrate to the United States, including on a K-1 visa. The Secretary of the Department of Homeland Security can issue a waiver of this Act at his or her sole discretion.

See also
90 Day Fiancé, a show where K-1 visa applicants are documented

References

Further reading 
 Bray, Ilona M., "Fiancé & marriage visas : a couple's guide to U.S. immigration", 5th ed., Berkeley, CA : Nolo, 2008. 
 Jones, James A., "The Immigration Marriage Fraud Amendments: Sham Marriages or Sham Legislation?", Florida State University Law Review, 1997
 United States Department of State, "Report of the Visa Office", Visa Office, Immigrant Visa Control and Reporting Division

External links

US State Department guidance on immigration for spouses and fiancé(e)s of US citizens
US State Department guidance on the K-1 nonimmigrant visa
State Department Foreign Affairs Manual section regarding K visas

United States visas by type